Sri Venkateswaraa Medical College Hospital and Research Centre (SVMCH&RC; French: Hôpital et centre de recherche du Sri Venkateshwaraa Medical College) is a private medical college and hospital located in Puducherry, India. The campus is situated in Ariyur, 16 kilometers from the city of Pondicherry. The institution is recognized by the Medical Council of India, Ministry of Health and Family Welfare of Government of India, and the Government of Puducherry. It is affiliated to Pondicherry University.

Campus

The campus contains the medical college, a hospital, student and resident hostels, staff quarters, ground and sporting fields.

Organization

The institute is under the direct administrative control of Sri Ramachandra Educational Trust (S.R.E.T).  There are 22 academic departments and ancillary hospital service units are supervised by respective technical heads.

Academics

The institute is affiliated to Pondicherry University. It offers medical and paramedical courses at the undergraduate level. Admission to the courses is made either on the basis of CENTAC, or on the recommendation of the college management (i.e. Management quota). The institute conducts research in modern medicine, public health and medical education. A research council at the institute level looks after the research activities and a scientific society provides a forum for presenting research work.

Preclinical and para-clinical departments
Anatomy
Physiology
Biochemistry
Pathology
Pharmacology
Microbiology
Perfusion technology

Clinical departments
Community medicine
Ophthalmology
Otorhinolaryngology (ENT)
General medicine 
General surgery
Obstetrics and gynaecology
Paediatrics
Orthopaedics
Psychiatry
Dermatology, venereology and leprosy
Tuberculosis and chest diseases
Anaesthesiology
Radiology
Diabetology

External links
 

Medical Council of India
Medical colleges in Puducherry
Universities and colleges in Pondicherry (city)
Hospitals in Puducherry